Albert de Cleyn (28 June 1917–13 March 1990) was a Belgian football player who became the first top scorer of the Belgian First Division with 40 goals in 1946 while playing for Mechelen. He played 12 times with the Belgium national team between 1946 and 1948. De Cleyn made his international debut on 19 January 1946 in a 2-0 friendly defeat to England. According to the RSSSF, during his career (1933-1955) he scored a total of 428 top league goals, which is the 5th best tally in European top league football, being bettered only by the likes of Josef Bican, Ferenc Puskas, Cristiano Ronaldo and Lionel Messi.

References

External links
 

1917 births
1990 deaths
Belgian footballers
K.V. Mechelen players
Belgium international footballers
Belgian Pro League players
Belgian football managers
K.V. Mechelen managers
Association football forwards